TV3 Lithuania (TV trys) is a Lithuanian free-to-air television channel that was launched on 11 April 1993. It was owned by Modern Times Group (MTG) until 2017, when it was acquired by Providence Equity Partners for €115 million.

Broadcasting 

 TV3 Lithuania is transmitted through digital terrestrial television. TV3, as with other channels of the Media Baltics group in the Baltic States, switched to HD broadcasting on 26 July 2018.
 The channel can also be seen via cable, satellite, IPTV or TV3 Play.

History 

 TV3 Lithuania first started broadcasting in 1992 as TELE-3.
 In 1996, the company filed for bankruptcy, as it was in debts. Then Modern Times Group (MTG) saved the company by paying out all of the debts.
 In 1997, TELE-3 programmes became broadcast as TV3 programmes.
 In 2017, MTG sold all of their TV channels and radio stations to Providence Equity Partners.

Programming 
Programs telecasted on TV3 include Sturm Der Liebe, Krepšinio namai, Bir Zamanlar Cukurova, Disegnando tu amor, Gelbėtojai išgelbėtojai, Mano meilė karantinas  and Gero Vakaro Šou. Routine programming  includes movies and lifestyle shows, as well as reality and news programs. The channel broadcasts the Lithuanian version of The X Factor and Secret Story.

Films

Sports

Basketball 

 2019 FIBA Basketball World Cup qualification
 2019 FIBA Basketball World Cup
 EuroBasket 2021 qualification
 EuroBasket 2022
 Lithuania national basketball team fixtures

Olympic Games 

 2018 Winter Olympics
 2020 Summer Olympics
 2022 Winter Olympics

See also 
List of Lithuanian television channels

References

External links 

 
Viasat Lithuania

Television channels in Lithuania
Modern Times Group
1993 establishments in Lithuania
Television channels and stations established in 1993
Television channels and stations established in 1997

lt:TV3